The Schackgalerie is a museum in Munich. It is one of the noted galleries in this city. The museum is under supervision of the Bavarian State Picture Collection.

Collection
In 1855, Adolf Friedrich von Schack settled in Munich and became a member of the academy of sciences. Here he began to amass a splendid collection of paintings that included masterpieces of Romanticism by painters such as Anselm Feuerbach, Moritz von Schwind, Arnold Böcklin, Franz von Lenbach, Carl Spitzweg, Carl Rottmann, and others. Upon his death in 1894, he bequeathed the collection to the Emperor William II, however it remained in Munich.

Building
The collection is housed in a building designed by Max Littmann (1907) next to the former diplomatic mission of Prussia in the Prinzregentenstraße as the emperor decided to keep the collection in Munich. The gallery building with its upper-level portico and the adjacent tract of the former Prussian embassy, appear as two independent building complexes, but are unified by a common base and corniceoring the connection. The façades of the buildings are built with bright sandstone. In the tympanium  is an imperial coat of arms and a dedication by William II.

Gallery

External links

https://www.pinakothek.de/sammlung/rundgang-sammlung-schack

Art museums and galleries in Germany
Neoclassical architecture in Munich
Museums in Munich